Jazz for Playboys is an album by saxophonist Frank Wess, trumpeter Joe Newman and guitarists Kenny Burrell and Freddie Greene recorded in late 1956 and early 1957 and released on the Savoy label.

Track listing 
 "Playboy" (Ernie Wilkins) – 5:24	
 "Miss Blues" (Joe Newman) – 9:37	
 "Baubles, Bangles and Beads" (Robert Wright, George Forrest) – 4:13	
 "Low Life" (Johnny Mandel) – 4:59	
 "Pin Up" (Frank Wess) – 4:05	
 "Blues for a Playmate" (Kenny Burrell) – 10:58
Recorded at Van Gelder Studio, Hackensack, NJ on December 26, 1956 (tracks 1, 2 & 4) and January 5, 1957 (tracks 3, 5 & 6)

Personnel 
Frank Wess – tenor saxophone, alto saxophone, flute
Joe Newman – trumpet (tracks 1, 2 & 4)
Kenny Burrell, Freddie Greene – guitar
Eddie Jones - bass
Gus Johnson (tracks 3, 5 & 6), Ed Thigpen (tracks 1, 2 & 4) - drums

References 

Frank Wess albums
1957 albums
Savoy Records albums
Albums produced by Ozzie Cadena
Albums recorded at Van Gelder Studio